Horizontal may refer to:

Horizontal plane, in astronomy, geography, geometry and other sciences and contexts
Horizontal coordinate system, in astronomy
Horizontalism, in monetary circuit theory
Horizontalism, in sociology
Horizontal market, in microeconomics
Horizontal (album), a 1968 album by the Bee Gees
"Horizontal" (song)" is a 1968 song by the Bee Gees

See also 
Horizontal and vertical
Horizontal fissure (disambiguation), anatomical features
Horizontal bar, an apparatus used by male gymnasts in artistic gymnastics
Vertical (disambiguation)